Arthur? Arthur! is a 1969 British comedy film directed by Samuel Gallu and starring Shelley Winters, Donald Pleasence and Terry-Thomas. It is based on the 1967 novel The Man Who Killed Himself by Julian Symons.

Plot 
A dull and unsuccessful inventor begins to develop a second identity as a man about town with a completely different life.

Cast

 Shelley Winters as Hester Green
 Donald Pleasence as Arthur Brownjohn / Sir Easonby 'E' Mellon
 Terry-Thomas as Clennery Tubbs
 Tammy Grimes as Lady Joan Mellon
 Rafiq Anwar as Majordomo
 Judith Arthy as Patricia Parker
 Michael Bates as Mr - Harrington
 Peter Bayliss as Doctor Hubble
 Joan Benham as Mrs Payne
 Mike Carnell as Postman
 Erik Chitty as Uncle Ratty
 Margaret Courtenay as Clare Brownjohn
 Frank Crawshaw as Dustman
 Mark Eden as Jack Parker
 Robin Ellis as Ames
 Angela Grant as Cynthia
 Basil Henson as Coverdale
 Raymond Huntley as George Payne
 Stanley Lebor as Analyst
 Garry Marsh as Golfer
 Keith Marsh as Lillywhite
 Harry Shacklock as Attendant
 Jeffrey Sirr as Waterboy
 Patsy Smart as Miss Bonnamie
 Oliver Tobias as Peter 'Bobo' Jackson
 Margery Withers as Susan
 Victor Brooks as Minor part

Premise
The 1968 film The Bliss of Mrs. Blossom also portrays an obscure suburban man, from a different social class, seeking relief from a mundane life.

References

External links
 

1969 films
1960s English-language films
1969 comedy films
British comedy films
Films set in London
Films shot in London
Films directed by Samuel Gallu
Films based on British novels
1960s British films